Skulen Hasidic dynasty was founded by Rav Eliezer Zusia Portugal. It was headed by his son, Rav Yisroel Avrohom Portugal until his death on April 1, 2019. Its name is originated from Sculeni (Yiddish: סקולען Skulen), a town in Bessarabia where Rabbi Eliezer Zusia was born and served as rabbi.

Biography 
Rabbi Eliezer Zusia Portugal succeeded his father as rabbi of Skulen at the age of 17 upon his father's death in 1915.  Thereupon he became a disciple of the rebbe of Bohush (Buhuși, Romania), a scion of the Ruzhiner dynasty.  Before the outbreak of World War II, Zusia moved to Chernovitz.  He survived the war and moved to Bucharest, the capital of Romania, where he opened an orphanage for the orphans left after the Holocaust.  When the Communists took over Romania, it became dangerous for him to continue to educate the children in the ways of Judaism, yet Zusia continued.  In 1959, the Communists arrested Zusia and his son, Yisroel Avrohom Portugal, for teaching religion and for supporting and educating orphans.  The Rebbes of Sadigura, Kopishnietz and Boyan led an international effort to free the Skulener Rebbe and his son, and eventually, at the request of the Lubavitcher Rebbe via his connections in Washington, Rabbi Eliezer Silver along with his son in 1960. Both immediately immigrated to the United States.  Upon moving to America, Zusia continued his works helping the underprivileged and began an international charity organization known as Chesed L'Avraham. He authored Noam Eliezer and Kedushas Eliezer, and composed many popular Hasidic melodies. He died in 1982 and was buried in the Viznitzer Cemetery in Monsey, New York.

Reb Eliezer Zusia was succeeded by his son, Rebbe Yisroel Avrohom Portugal who continued his father's work by running the Chesed L'Avraham organization to help the needy in Israel and around the world, and also wrote many Hasidic melodies. Portugal died on April 1, 2019. 

Reb Yisroel Avrohom was succeeded by his 5 sons, the oldest son Rebbe Yeshaya Yakov Portugal, was crowned as the Skulener Rebbe. In Williamsburg, his son Rebbe Meir Portugal was crowned as Skulen Rebbe, In Monsey, his son Rebbe Efraim Yehuda Portugal who was previously the head of the Monsey community, was crowned as Skulen Rebbe, in Lakewood NJ. Rebbe Zvi Noach Portugal, who was previously the head of the Lakewood community, was crowned as Skulen Rebbe. In Yerushalayim his son Rebbe Shmiel Mordche Portugal, who was previously the Rav of the Boro Park community was crowned as Skulen Rebbe in jerusalem,

The central Skulener synagogue is located on 54th street in the Boro Park section of Brooklyn, New York, near 13th avenue.

Lineage of Skulener Dynasty 
Rebbe Yeshayah Shor of Yas - author of K'lil Tiferes - disciple of Rebbe Mordechai of Kremnitz (Kremenets) - son of the Maggid of Zlotshov.
Rebbe Yisrael Avraham Portugal (d. 1915) of Skulen - author of Shem uSh'aris Yisrael - disciple of the K'lil Tiferes.
Rebbe Eliezer Zusia Portugal of Skulen (1898-1982) - author of Noam Eliezer - son of the Shem uSh'aris Yisrael, disciple of Rabbi Yisrael Shalom Yosef Friedman (1863-1923), of Bohush and Rabbi Mordechai Shalom Yosef Friedman (1886-1979), of Sadigura.
Rebbe Yisroel Avrohom Portugal (1923-2019) - son of the Noam Eliezer.
Rebbe Yeshaya Yakov Portugal of Boro Park (rebbe since 2019) - eldest son of Rebbe Yisroel Avrohom
Rebbe Meir Portugal of Williamsburg (rebbe since 2022) - son of Rebbe Yisroel Avrohom
Rebbe Efraim Yehuda Portugal of Monsey (rebbe since 2019) - son of Rebbe Yisroel Avrohom
Rebbe Zvi Noach Portugal of Lakewood (rebbe since 2019) - son of Rebbe Yisroel Avrohom
Rebbe Shmiel Mordche of Yerushalayim (rebbe since December 2020) - son of Rebbe Yisroel Avrohom

References 

Hasidic dynasties
People from Sculeni